General Sir Robert Abercromby  (21 October 17403 November 1827), the youngest brother of Sir Ralph Abercromby, was a general in the army, Governor of Bombay and Commander-in-Chief of the Bombay Army and then Commander-in-Chief, India, the East India Company.

He was the son of Prof George Abercromby (1705-1800) of Tullibody House.

Military career

Abercromby served in the French and Indian War, and was promoted captain in 1761.  On 30 Nov. 1775, he was promoted to lieutenant colonel of the 37th Regiment of Foot.  During the American Revolutionary War, he fought at the Battle of Long Island, the Battle of Brandywine, the Battle of Germantown, the Battle of Crooked Billet, the Battle of Monmouth and at the sieges of Charleston and Yorktown, where he commanded the left wing of the British forces. He commanded a battalion of light infantry for most of the war.

After the war, he was made Colonel for life of the 75th (Highland) Regiment, a regiment newly raised to deter the French in India. Abercromby served in India from 1790 to 1797, where he was Governor of Bombay and Commander-in-Chief of the Bombay Army and then, from 1793, Commander-in-Chief, India.

In 1798 he purchased Airthrey Castle from the Haldane family and was thereafter entitled Abercromby of Aithrey.

He was promoted lieutenant-general in 1797, elected M.P. for the county of Clackmannan in the place of his brother Ralph in 1798, and was made governor of Edinburgh Castle in 1801—a post he held until his death—and a general in 1802. His increasing blindness - arising from an eye disease contracted before his return from India in 1797 - made it impossible for him ever again to take active service, and obliged him to resign his seat in parliament in 1802.

References

External links
Appleton's Cyclopedia of American Biography, edited by James Grant Wilson, John Fiske and Stanley L. Klos. Six volumes, New York: D. Appleton and Company, 1887–1889 

 

1740 births
1827 deaths
Members of the Parliament of Great Britain for Scottish constituencies
British MPs 1790–1796
British MPs 1796–1800
Members of the Parliament of the United Kingdom for Scottish constituencies
UK MPs 1801–1802
British Commanders-in-Chief of India
Knights Grand Cross of the Order of the Bath
British Army generals
British Army personnel of the French and Indian War
British Army personnel of the American Revolutionary War
British Army personnel of the French Revolutionary Wars
Governors of Bombay
Commanders-in-chief of Bombay
37th Regiment of Foot officers
Robert
Scottish blind people
People from Clackmannanshire